FK Pohronie is a Slovak football team, based in the town of Žiar nad Hronom. The club currently competes in 2. Liga. The 2019/20 season was the first time in the club's history that the team played in Fortuna Liga, the highest level of the Slovak football league system. The club avoided relegation that season, and continued in the top division for the 2020/21 season. In the 2021/22 season the team was relegated.

History
On 1 June 2012, Sokol Dolná Ždaňa and FK Žiar nad Hronom reached an agreement regarding the running of the new club.

Affiliated clubs
The following clubs were or are affiliated with FK Pohronie :
  MFK Žarnovica (2018–2019)
  MFK Nová Baňa (2019–2022)
  FK Železiarne Podbrezová (2022-)

Honours

Domestic
 2. Liga (1993–present)
  Winners (1): 2018–19 (Promoted)
 3. Liga - Central (1993–present)
  Winners (1): 2012–13 (Promoted)

Recent seasons

Sponsorship

Current squad
As of 3 March 2023

For recent transfers, see List of Slovak football transfers winter 2022-23

Out on loan

Current staff
As of 8 March 2023

Player records

Most goals

Players whose name is listed in bold are still active.

Reserve team 
FK Pohronie B is inactive. Most recently, it had played in the Slovak 7th football level ( VII. liga DOUBLE STAR BET ObFZ ZH).

Notable players 
The following notable players had international caps for their respective countries. Players whose name is listed in bold represented their countries while playing for FK Pohronie. 
Notable players, who have played for predecessor clubs, FK Žiar nad Hronom and Sokol Dolná Ždaňa, are listed with their respective clubs.

 Cedric Badolo
 Bonfils-Caleb Bimenyimana
 Willie Britto
 Martin Chrien
 Dominik Holec
 Richard Lásik
 Yusuf Mainge
 Jaroslav Mihalík
 František Plach
 Muhammed Sanneh
 Lukáš Tesák
 Mateusz Zachara

Managers

 Štefan Zaťko (2012 – May 2016)
 Rastislav Štanga (May 2016 – June 2016)
 Peter Černák (July 2016 – Aug 2016)
 Miloš Foltán (Aug 2016 – Sept 2017)
 Milan Nemec (Sept 2017 – July 2019)
 Rastislav Urgela (Aug 2019) (car.)
 Ján Rosinský (Aug 2019 – Oct 2019)
 Mikuláš Radványi (Oct 2019 – Oct. 2020)
 Jan Kameník (Oct 2020 – May 2021)
 Gergely Geri (June 2021 – Aug 2021)
 Štefan Zaťko (Aug 2021 – Sept 2021) (car.)
 Pablo Villar (Oct 2021 – Dec 2021)
 Martin Bittengl (Jan 2022 – April 2022)
 Peter Lérant (April 2022 – Dec 2022)
 Jan Kameník (Jan 2023)
 Rastislav Urgela (Jan 2023 – ) (car.)

References

External links 
Official club website 

TJ Sokol Dolná Ždaňa website 
FK Žiar nad Hronom website 

Pohronie
Association football clubs established in 2012
2012 establishments in Slovakia